is a member of the Japanese Communist Party who served in both the House of Representatives  and the House of Councillors. In the House of Representatives, she represented the 10th District of Kanagawa prefecture, while in the House of Councillors she represented the second seat of the Kanagawa at-large district. Hatano is opposed to the Technical Intern Training Program, saying that the workers in the program are being subordinated. She is also opposed to the Trans-Pacific Partnership. Hatano supports having more classes available in the evenings at junior high schools and is opposed to stopping state grants to national universities, saying that tuition would increase dramatically.

Early life 
Hatano was born on 19 January 1957 in Nakahara Ward, Kawasaki City, Kanagawa Prefecture. She would eventually graduate from Kamimaruko Primary School, Kamanigaya Middle School and Midorigaoka High School. During high school, she wished to become a manga artist, so much so that she created a manga study group for that purpose. After leaving high school however, she went on to earn a Bachelor of Education from Yokohama National University. which she used to become a teacher in a number of high schools and junior high schools in Kanagawa Prefecture, as well as for a Junior High school in Ōta Ward, Tokyo

Political career 
After being invited by former classmates from her high school who were supportive of the Japanese Communist Party, she began working as the chairman of the Kanagawa Prefectural Committee for the Democratic Youth League and around the same time joined the Communist Party.

In the 1995 House of Councillors election, she ran as a Communist Party candidate for the Kanagawa at-large district, but was unsuccessful coming in 6th place. In the 1998 House of Councillors election, she again ran for the Kanagawa district and won, in part thanks to a boom of support for the Communist Party and the fact that the conservative vote had been split among a number of different candidates. She is so far the on member of the Communist Party to have been elected to the Kanagawa district.

During her time in the House of Councillors, she was a member of the Committee on Education and Science, Accounting Committee, the National Life and Economic Survey Committee and was the vice-chairman of the National Diet Affairs Committee of the House of Councillors with the Communist Party.

She ran for re-election in the 2004 House of Councillors election for the Kanagawa district but was defeated, in part due to a decline in support for the Communist Party and in part due to the consolidation of the conservative vote around the candidate from the Liberal Democratic Party.

She ran in the 2005 By-election and in the 2007 election but was defeated both times.

Election results

House of Councillor elections

House of Representatives elections

Single Member District results

References

1957 births
Living people
Politicians from Kanagawa Prefecture
People from Kawasaki, Kanagawa
Japanese Communist Party politicians
Female members of the House of Representatives (Japan)
Members of the House of Representatives (Japan)
Female members of the House of Councillors (Japan)
Members of the House of Councillors (Japan)